Major General George Henry McManus (December 23, 1867 – August 8, 1954) was a U.S. Army general.

Early life
George Henry McManus was born December 23, 1867, in Hudson, Iowa. He graduated with a degree from Iowa State Teachers College, and then entered the United States Military Academy and graduated number nine of fifty-one in the class of 1893.

Military career
McManus was commissioned in the artillery, and he stayed in the Coast Artillery when the Artillery Corps divided into field and Coast Artillery in 1907. He served in the China Relief Expedition and the Philippine–American War, as well as in the Atlantic, the Pacific, and the Philippines.

During World War I, he was a troop movement officer at the port of embarkation in Hoboken, New Jersey. On October 1, 1918, he was promoted to brigadier general. For his performance of this duty, he received the Distinguished Service Medal and the Navy Cross.

On December 1, 1931, he retired as a brigadier general.

Personal life
On January 7, 1897, he married Gertrude Kessler, and they had four children: Sarah C. McManus, George Henry McManus, Jr., Thomas Kessler McManus, and Mary Alice McManus. Mcmanus died in the Presidio of San Francisco on August 27, 1954. He is buried in San Francisco National Cemetery.

References

External links
 

1867 births
1954 deaths
United States Army generals
Burials at Fort Sam Houston National Cemetery
People from Iowa
Recipients of the Navy Cross (United States)
Recipients of the Distinguished Service Medal (US Army)
American military personnel of the Philippine–American War
United States Army generals of World War I